Dixie is an out-of-print collectible card game that uses dice and special trading cards to allow players to refight famous American Civil War battles, such as the battles of First Bull Run, Shiloh, and Gettysburg. It was produced in 1994 by Columbia Games with rules loosely based on its 'wooden block' series of games.

Game play
Cards have drawings depicting the approximate uniforms that each unit wore at the actual battle. Special cards depict key terrain features, generals, and scenario-related special events (such as rallies, ammunition, morale, etc.). One player uses a deck for the Union Army; the opponent plays the Confederate States Army deck. There are four phases to each game turn — Morale, Combat, Move, and Reinforce.

Game sets
"Bull Run" was the first Dixie set issued, and was sold as starter packs in boxes with 60 random cards (30 from the Union, 30 from the Confederates). Cards represented each regiment,  artillery battery, or general present at the battle. The complete set consists of 200 cards. "Shiloh", the second set in the series, is the largest set, with 400 cards. Its cards also depict individual regiments in their approximate uniforms worn at the battle, with art by Eric Hotz. The third set, "Gettysburg," also was sold in collectible decks of 60 cards (36 Union, 24 Confederate), with a full set having 250 cards. Unlike the other two games, "Gettysburg" is at the brigade scale, with artillery at the battalion level.

Dixie cards had, like most other collectible card games, several degrees of rarity. Unusually, rather than label powerful cards 'rare' and restrict their availability, all cards had versions tagged as 'bronze' (common), 'silver' (uncommon), or 'gold' (rare). This did not affect game play in any way — a deck of common cards was as playable as one stuffed with rares - but still provided a measure of competitive collecting outside the game.

Reception
In the November 1995 edition of Dragon (issue 223), Rick Swan gave the game a thumbs up, saying, "Yes it's history, but it's fun history — I'm not kidding!... Expand your horizons — skip a pizza or forego your fifth screening of Batman Forever and invest the proceeds in a Dixie deck. General Grant would be proud."

In the February 1996 edition of Arcane (Issue 3), Steve Faragher gave Dixie an average rating of 7 out of 10, saying, "it's a fun game that offers many an hour of pleasant (if perhaps only mildly exciting) entertainment. The game can be played straight from the starter deck and added to at your leisure, which is a good thing. On the other hand, it doesn't really offer the huge variety of options that a game such as Magic: The Gathering does."

References

External links

Review in Shadis

American Civil War games
Card games introduced in 1994
Collectible card games
Columbia Games games